The Braille pattern dots-2356 is a 6-dot braille cell with both middle and both bottom dots raised, or an 8-dot braille cell with both upper-middle and both lower-middle dots raised. It is represented by the Unicode code point U+2836, and in Braille ASCII with the number 7.

Unified Braille

In unified international braille, the braille pattern dots-2356 is used for punctuation, or otherwise as needed.

Table of unified braille values

Other braille

Plus dots 7 and 8

Related to Braille pattern dots-2356 are Braille patterns 23567, 23568, and 235678, which are used in 8-dot braille systems, such as Gardner-Salinas and Luxembourgish Braille.

Related 8-dot kantenji patterns

In the Japanese kantenji braille, the standard 8-dot Braille patterns 3678, 13678, 34678, and 134678 are the patterns related to Braille pattern dots-2356, since the two additional dots of kantenji patterns 02356, 23567, and 023567 are placed above the base 6-dot cell, instead of below, as in standard 8-dot braille.

Kantenji using braille patterns 3678, 13678, 34678, or 134678

This listing includes kantenji using Braille pattern dots-2356 for all 6349 kanji found in JIS C 6226-1978.

  - 囲

Variants and thematic compounds

  -  selector 1 + 囗  =  伐
  -  selector 2 + 囗  =  戎
  -  selector 3 + 囗  =  弋
  -  selector 4 + 囗  =  戈
  -  selector 5 + 囗  =  冂
  -  selector 6 + 囗  =  亶
  -  囗 + selector 1  =  我
  -  囗 + selector 2  =  式
  -  囗 + selector 3  =  用
  -  囗 + selector 4  =  或
  -  囗 + selector 5  =  戔
  -  囗 + selector 6  =  角
  -  比 + 囗  =  凹

Compounds of 囲 and 囗

  -  囗 + な/亻  =  囚
  -  に/氵 + 囗 + な/亻  =  泅
  -  囗 + れ/口  =  回
  -  囗 + 囗 + れ/口  =  囘
  -  な/亻 + 囗 + れ/口  =  嗇
  -  へ/⺩ + 囗  =  牆
  -  つ/土 + 囗 + れ/口  =  墻
  -  き/木 + 囗 + れ/口  =  檣
  -  ふ/女 + 囗 + れ/口  =  艢
  -  心 + 囗 + れ/口  =  薔
  -  ゆ/彳 + 囗 + れ/口  =  徊
  -  て/扌 + 囗 + れ/口  =  擅
  -  ね/示 + 囗 + れ/口  =  禀
  -  の/禾 + 囗 + れ/口  =  稟
  -  る/忄 + 囗 + れ/口  =  懍
  -  よ/广 + 囗 + れ/口  =  廩
  -  く/艹 + 囗 + れ/口  =  茴
  -  む/車 + 囗 + れ/口  =  蛔
  -  ひ/辶 + 囗 + れ/口  =  迴
  -  お/頁 + 囗 + れ/口  =  顫
  -  囗 + け/犬  =  因
  -  れ/口 + 囗 + け/犬  =  咽
  -  も/門 + 囗 + け/犬  =  氤
  -  火 + 囗 + け/犬  =  烟
  -  く/艹 + 囗 + け/犬  =  茵
  -  囗 + て/扌  =  団
  -  囗 + 囗 + て/扌  =  團
  -  囗 + ほ/方  =  囮
  -  囗 + き/木  =  困
  -  る/忄 + 囗 + き/木  =  悃
  -  き/木 + 囗 + き/木  =  梱
  -  囗 + 龸  =  図
  -  囗 + 囗 + 龸  =  圖
  -  囗 + ろ/十  =  固
  -  な/亻 + 囗  =  個
  -  氷/氵 + 囗 + ろ/十  =  凅
  -  に/氵 + 囗 + ろ/十  =  涸
  -  や/疒 + 囗 + ろ/十  =  痼
  -  か/金 + 囗 + ろ/十  =  錮
  -  囗 + へ/⺩  =  国
  -  囗 + 囗 + へ/⺩  =  國
  -  し/巿 + 囗 + へ/⺩  =  幗
  -  ⺼ + 囗 + へ/⺩  =  膕
  -  て/扌 + 囗 + へ/⺩  =  掴
  -  き/木 + 囗 + へ/⺩  =  椢
  -  囗 + さ/阝  =  圏
  -  囗 + 囗 + さ/阝  =  圈
  -  囗 + え/訁  =  園
  -  く/艹 + 囗 + え/訁  =  薗
  -  く/艹 + 囗  =  菌
  -  selector 1 + 囗 + へ/⺩  =  囗
  -  囗 + 仁/亻 + ろ/十  =  囹
  -  囗 + ろ/十 + ら/月  =  囿
  -  囗 + 龸 + ほ/方  =  圀
  -  囗 + 宿 + ほ/方  =  圃
  -  囗 + ら/月 + れ/口  =  圄
  -  囗 + つ/土 + か/金  =  圉
  -  囗 + 宿 + い/糹/#2  =  圍
  -  囗 + 宿 + る/忄  =  圜
  -  に/氵 + 宿 + 囗  =  溷
  -  の/禾 + 宿 + 囗  =  穡
  -  ち/竹 + 龸 + 囗  =  箘
  -  さ/阝 + 宿 + 囗  =  鄙
  -  囗 + そ/馬 + 比  =  麕

Compounds of 伐

  -  ね/示 + 囗  =  袋
  -  を/貝 + 囗  =  貸
  -  も/門 + 囗  =  閥
  -  仁/亻 + 囗  =  代
  -  つ/土 + 仁/亻 + 囗  =  垈
  -  や/疒 + 仁/亻 + 囗  =  岱
  -  へ/⺩ + 仁/亻 + 囗  =  玳
  -  し/巿 + 仁/亻 + 囗  =  黛
  -  ち/竹 + 宿 + 囗  =  筏

Compounds of 戎

  -  い/糹/#2 + 宿 + 囗  =  絨

Compounds of 弋

  -  囗 + い/糹/#2  =  弐
  -  selector 1 + 囗 + い/糹/#2  =  弍
  -  囗 + 囗 + い/糹/#2  =  貳
  -  ⺼ + 囗 + い/糹/#2  =  膩
  -  囗 + ん/止  =  武
  -  龸 + 囗 + ん/止  =  斌
  -  を/貝 + 囗 + ん/止  =  贇
  -  か/金 + 囗 + ん/止  =  錻
  -  ゐ/幺 + 囗  =  幾
  -  き/木 + 囗  =  機
  -  ま/石 + 囗  =  磯
  -  え/訁 + ゐ/幺 + 囗  =  譏
  -  せ/食 + ゐ/幺 + 囗  =  饑
  -  囗 + ゐ/幺  =  畿
  -  き/木 + 龸 + 囗  =  杙
  -  囗 + 龸 + せ/食  =  鵡

Compounds of 戈

  -  と/戸 + 囗  =  戒
  -  え/訁 + と/戸 + 囗  =  誡
  -  れ/口 + 囗  =  戦
  -  れ/口 + れ/口 + 囗  =  戰
  -  す/発 + 囗  =  戯
  -  す/発 + す/発 + 囗  =  戲
  -  selector 4 + 囗 + い/糹/#2  =  貮
  -  を/貝 + selector 4 + 囗  =  戝
  -  ろ/十 + selector 4 + 囗  =  戟
  -  む/車 + selector 4 + 囗  =  戮
  -  や/疒 + selector 4 + 囗  =  戳
  -  て/扌 + selector 4 + 囗  =  找
  -  お/頁 + 宿 + 囗  =  戛
  -  お/頁 + 龸 + 囗  =  戞
  -  も/門 + 宿 + 囗  =  戡

Compounds of 冂

  -  ろ/十 + 囗  =  再
  -  selector 1 + ろ/十 + 囗  =  冉
  -  く/艹 + ろ/十 + 囗  =  苒
  -  た/⽥ + 囗  =  冑
  -  囗 + 仁/亻  =  内
  -  れ/口 + 囗 + 仁/亻  =  吶
  -  ⺼ + 囗 + 仁/亻  =  肭
  -  む/車 + 囗 + 仁/亻  =  蚋
  -  ね/示 + 囗 + 仁/亻  =  衲
  -  え/訁 + 囗 + 仁/亻  =  訥
  -  と/戸 + 囗 + 仁/亻  =  靹
  -  囗 + ね/示  =  剛
  -  囗 + と/戸  =  同
  -  囗 + り/分  =  興
  -  火 + 囗 + り/分  =  爨
  -  せ/食 + 囗 + り/分  =  釁
  -  る/忄 + 囗 + と/戸  =  恫
  -  に/氵 + 囗 + と/戸  =  洞
  -  の/禾 + 囗 + と/戸  =  粡
  -  囗 + こ/子  =  向
  -  せ/食 + 囗 + こ/子  =  餉
  -  囗 + つ/土  =  周
  -  囗 + う/宀/#3  =  彫
  -  ち/竹 + 囗 + う/宀/#3  =  簓
  -  氷/氵 + 囗 + つ/土  =  凋
  -  る/忄 + 囗 + つ/土  =  惆
  -  の/禾 + 囗 + つ/土  =  稠
  -  い/糹/#2 + 囗 + つ/土  =  綢
  -  む/車 + 囗 + つ/土  =  蜩
  -  囗 + の/禾  =  奥
  -  る/忄 + 囗  =  懊
  -  つ/土 + 囗 + の/禾  =  墺
  -  囗 + 囗 + の/禾  =  奧
  -  に/氵 + 囗 + の/禾  =  澳
  -  火 + 囗 + の/禾  =  燠
  -  ま/石 + 囗 + の/禾  =  礇
  -  も/門 + 囗 + の/禾  =  粤
  -  ね/示 + 囗 + の/禾  =  襖
  -  囗 + ゆ/彳  =  岡
  -  や/疒 + 囗 + ゆ/彳  =  崗
  -  き/木 + 囗 + ゆ/彳  =  棡
  -  囗 + 囗 + ゆ/彳  =  堽
  -  囗 + め/目  =  爾
  -  ゆ/彳 + 囗 + め/目  =  彌
  -  氷/氵 + 囗 + め/目  =  瀰
  -  に/氵 + 囗 + め/目  =  濔
  -  ね/示 + 囗 + め/目  =  禰
  -  囗 + 宿 + え/訁  =  冏
  -  火 + 囗 + れ/口  =  烱
  -  い/糹/#2 + 囗 + れ/口  =  絅
  -  ひ/辶 + 囗 + こ/子  =  迥
  -  火 + 宿 + 囗  =  炯
  -  ひ/辶 + 宿 + 囗  =  邇
  -  囗 + selector 4 + い/糹/#2  =  雕

Compounds of 亶

  -  龸 + 囗  =  壇
  -  心 + 龸 + 囗  =  檀
  -  囗 + selector 4 + せ/食  =  氈
  -  そ/馬 + 龸 + 囗  =  羶

Compounds of 我

  -  そ/馬 + 囗  =  義
  -  や/疒 + そ/馬 + 囗  =  嶬
  -  日 + そ/馬 + 囗  =  曦
  -  ま/石 + そ/馬 + 囗  =  礒
  -  ふ/女 + そ/馬 + 囗  =  艤
  -  む/車 + 囗  =  蛾
  -  え/訁 + 囗  =  議
  -  せ/食 + 囗  =  餓
  -  な/亻 + 囗 + selector 1  =  俄
  -  れ/口 + 囗 + selector 1  =  哦
  -  ふ/女 + 囗 + selector 1  =  娥
  -  や/疒 + 囗 + selector 1  =  峨
  -  心 + 囗 + selector 1  =  莪
  -  囗 + selector 1 + せ/食  =  鵝
  -  や/疒 + 宿 + 囗  =  峩
  -  囗 + 宿 + せ/食  =  鵞

Compounds of 式

  -  ゑ/訁 + 囗  =  試
  -  む/車 + 囗 + selector 2  =  軾
  -  囗 + め/目 + の/禾  =  弑
  -  て/扌 + 宿 + 囗  =  拭

Compounds of 用

  -  よ/广 + 囗  =  庸
  -  な/亻 + よ/广 + 囗  =  傭
  -  る/忄 + よ/广 + 囗  =  慵
  -  む/車 + 囗 + selector 3  =  蛹

Compounds of 或

  -  囗 + 心  =  惑
  -  も/門 + 囗 + selector 4  =  閾
  -  囗 + お/頁 + selector 4  =  馘

Compounds of 戔

  -  ほ/方 + 囗  =  残
  -  ほ/方 + ほ/方 + 囗  =  殘
  -  に/氵 + 囗  =  浅
  -  に/氵 + に/氵 + 囗  =  淺
  -  お/頁 + 囗  =  賎
  -  に/氵 + お/頁 + 囗  =  濺
  -  み/耳 + 囗  =  践
  -  み/耳 + み/耳 + 囗  =  踐
  -  か/金 + 囗  =  銭
  -  か/金 + か/金 + 囗  =  錢
  -  き/木 + 宿 + 囗  =  桟
  -  き/木 + selector 4 + 囗  =  棧
  -  へ/⺩ + 宿 + 囗  =  牋
  -  囗 + 宿 + ⺼  =  盞
  -  ち/竹 + selector 4 + 囗  =  箋
  -  い/糹/#2 + 龸 + 囗  =  綫
  -  を/貝 + 宿 + 囗  =  賤
  -  せ/食 + 宿 + 囗  =  餞

Compounds of 角

  -  囗 + そ/馬  =  解
  -  よ/广 + 囗 + そ/馬  =  廨
  -  る/忄 + 囗 + そ/馬  =  懈
  -  む/車 + 囗 + そ/馬  =  蟹
  -  ひ/辶 + 囗 + そ/馬  =  邂
  -  囗 + そ/馬 + selector 2  =  觧
  -  囗 + む/車  =  触
  -  囗 + 囗 + む/車  =  觸
  -  囗 + 数  =  觴
  -  れ/口 + 囗 + selector 6  =  嘴
  -  つ/土 + 囗 + selector 6  =  埆
  -  き/木 + 囗 + selector 6  =  桷
  -  心 + 囗 + selector 6  =  槲
  -  囗 + 比 + と/戸  =  斛
  -  む/車 + 龸 + 囗  =  蠏
  -  囗 + 宿 + こ/子  =  觚
  -  囗 + 比 + selector 4  =  觜
  -  囗 + selector 1 + ん/止  =  觝
  -  囗 + う/宀/#3 + せ/食  =  鵤

Compounds of 凹

  -  い/糹/#2 + 比 + 囗  =  雋

Compounds of 口

  -  う/宀/#3 + 囗  =  亮
  -  れ/口 + う/宀/#3 + 囗  =  喨
  -  さ/阝 + 囗  =  叩
  -  ぬ/力 + 囗  =  召
  -  ぬ/力 + ぬ/力 + 囗  =  劭
  -  そ/馬 + ぬ/力 + 囗  =  貂
  -  ひ/辶 + ぬ/力 + 囗  =  迢
  -  さ/阝 + ぬ/力 + 囗  =  邵
  -  ま/石 + ぬ/力 + 囗  =  韶
  -  り/分 + 囗  =  合
  -  て/扌 + 囗  =  拾
  -  ち/竹 + 囗  =  答
  -  れ/口 + り/分 + 囗  =  哈
  -  ふ/女 + り/分 + 囗  =  姶
  -  や/疒 + り/分 + 囗  =  峇
  -  る/忄 + り/分 + 囗  =  恰
  -  て/扌 + り/分 + 囗  =  拿
  -  ん/止 + り/分 + 囗  =  歙
  -  に/氵 + り/分 + 囗  =  洽
  -  ⺼ + り/分 + 囗  =  盒
  -  ち/竹 + り/分 + 囗  =  箚
  -  の/禾 + り/分 + 囗  =  粭
  -  心 + り/分 + 囗  =  荅
  -  と/戸 + り/分 + 囗  =  鞳
  -  む/車 + り/分 + 囗  =  蛤
  -  ね/示 + り/分 + 囗  =  袷
  -  も/門 + り/分 + 囗  =  閤
  -  ま/石 + り/分 + 囗  =  龕
  -  し/巿 + 囗  =  吊
  -  ふ/女 + 囗  =  否
  -  や/疒 + ふ/女 + 囗  =  痞
  -  け/犬 + 囗  =  呑
  -  つ/土 + 囗  =  喜
  -  な/亻 + つ/土 + 囗  =  僖
  -  る/忄 + つ/土 + 囗  =  憙
  -  き/木 + つ/土 + 囗  =  橲
  -  火 + つ/土 + 囗  =  熹
  -  ね/示 + つ/土 + 囗  =  禧
  -  せ/食 + つ/土 + 囗  =  鱚
  -  氷/氵 + 囗  =  淳
  -  や/疒 + 囗  =  癌
  -  の/禾 + 囗  =  粘
  -  い/糹/#2 + 囗  =  給
  -  ⺼ + 囗  =  膈
  -  囗 + 囗  =  呟
  -  囗 + 宿  =  呪
  -  囗 + か/金  =  呵
  -  囗 + ぬ/力  =  喫
  -  囗 + ⺼  =  嘲
  -  囗 + し/巿  =  噂
  -  囗 + み/耳  =  囁
  -  囗 + ひ/辶  =  邑
  -  よ/广 + 囗 + ひ/辶  =  廱
  -  や/疒 + 囗 + ひ/辶  =  癰
  -  る/忄 + 囗 + ひ/辶  =  悒
  -  と/戸 + 囗 + ひ/辶  =  扈
  -  に/氵 + 囗 + ひ/辶  =  滬
  -  囗 + お/頁  =  頷
  -  囗 + せ/食  =  鳴
  -  ⺼ + 囗 + け/犬  =  臙
  -  れ/口 + 宿 + 囗  =  串
  -  囗 + ま/石 + し/巿  =  啻
  -  囗 + 宿 + ん/止  =  嗽
  -  囗 + ゐ/幺 + や/疒  =  嚮
  -  囗 + ん/止 + の/禾  =  齠

Other compounds

  -  囗 + ま/石  =  函
  -  囗 + 囗 + ま/石  =  凾
  -  に/氵 + 囗 + ま/石  =  涵
  -  囗 + 比  =  麗
  -  な/亻 + 囗 + 比  =  儷
  -  に/氵 + 囗 + 比  =  灑
  -  そ/馬 + 囗 + 比  =  驪
  -  ひ/辶 + 囗 + め/目  =  迩
  -  む/車 + 宿 + 囗  =  輿
  -  と/戸 + ぬ/力 + 囗  =  髫

Notes

Braille patterns